The 2023 Asbury revival was a Christian revival at Asbury University in Wilmore, Kentucky. The revival was sparked by students spontaneously staying in Hughes Auditorium following a regularly scheduled chapel service on February 8, 2023. Following the gathering, Asbury President Kevin Brown sent out a brief two-sentence email: "There's worship happening in Hughes. You're welcome to join." The news of the phenomenon quickly spread through social media and in Christian online publications. The revival has been compared to similar revivals at Asbury, notably one that took place in 1970, which had far-reaching consequences in Methodism, culture of the United States, and the growth of the Jesus movement. Notably, news of the revival largely spread on social media, as the participants were mainly members of Generation Z. It was attended by approximately 15,000 people each day. By its end, the revival brought 50,000–70,000 visitors to Wilmore, representing more than 200 academic institutions and multiple countries.

Background
Asbury University is a private Christian liberal arts university affiliated with the Wesleyan-Holiness movement. Chapel attendance is mandatory for students on certain weekdays. On Wednesday, February 8, 2023, a handful of students remained in the chapel following a regularly scheduled service. Student body president Alison Perfater was one of them, and in an interview with Tucker Carlson, said it was after a fellow student decided to openly confess some of his sins to the small group that "the atmosphere changed". According to Perfater:

Initially only student publications and Methodist circles shared news of the event. Asbury University has a history of revivals, dating back to 1905, 1908, 1921, 1950, 1958, 1970, 1992, and 2006. The 1970 revival at Asbury had far-reaching cultural effects, and remains central to the construction of Asbury's spiritual identity. The revival has been described as calm, with some commentators having noted the absence of many contemporary worship features. The revival was additionally significant because of its spread on social media, particularly among Generation Z, the most irreligious generation in US history. On February 15, hashtag "asburyrevival" had over 24 million views on TikTok, which increased to 63 million by February 18.

Responses to the revival have been reported at other university campuses, such as Samford University, Cedarville University and University of the Cumberlands. The revival notably is ecumenical in its expression, with Methodist, Baptist, Episcopal, and Roman Catholic groups participating in its spread. Visitors told The Washington Post stories of "miracles and healing" they witnessed at the event, along with unparalleled hospitality by locals and students.

Timeline

Measles case 
An unvaccinated person from Jessamine County, Kentucky who attended the revival on 18 February 2023 tested positive for the measles following their attendance at the revival. The case was the third in Kentucky in three months previous to the revival. Unvaccinated attendees were asked by public health officials to quarantine for 21 days following exposure and then get immunized.

See also

 Evangelicalism
 Ichthus Festival
 Wesleyan theology

References

2023 in Christianity
2023 in Kentucky
February 2023 events in the United States
Christian revivals
Asbury University
Jessamine County, Kentucky